Psoralidium tenuiflorum, the slimflower scurfpea, is a perennial in the pea family. This flower can be found mainly in the central and southwestern U.S.

This plant was first described by the German-American botanist Frederick Traugott Pursh who gave it the name Psoralea tenuiflora. It was later transferred to the genus Psoralidium by the American botanist Per Axel Rydberg, becoming Psoralidium tenuiflorum. In 2009, A.N. Egan and J. Reveal proposed placing it in the genus Pediomelum, making it Pediomelum tenuiflorum, however, this is not accepted by all taxonomists.

Preferred habitat
A hardy plant that prefers semi-desert, sandy habitats, scrubland, and woodland, Psoralidium tenuiflorum is resistant to drought because of its long taproot.

Description
The slender stems are grayish-green and bear compound leaves with either three, or four to five leaflets. Short racemes of purplish pea-flowers grow at intervals. The flowers are followed by short cylindrical pods, each bearing a single seed.

Distribution
This plant can be found in the central and southwestern states of the U.S., including Arizona, Colorado, Iowa, Illinois, Indiana, Kansas, Kentucky, Minnesota, Missouri, Montana, North Dakota, Nebraska, New Mexico, Oklahoma, South Dakota, Texas, Utah, Wisconsin and Wyoming.

Ecology
The flowers of Psoralidium tenuiflorum are attractive to bees and are visited by such bees as Svastra obliqua, Colletes willistoni, and Calliopsis andreniformis. The leaf beetle Luperosoma parallelum and grasshoppers such as Melanoplus femurrubrum, Melanoplus foedus, and Melanoplus packardii feed on the leaves, and the larvae of the moth Schinia jaguarina feed on the seed pods.

Uses
There are many traditional uses for this plant. For example, its root is edible either raw or cooked and can also be ground up and used to thicken soups, or mixed with cereals to make bread. The plant can also be used as an ingredient in an alcoholic drink derived from Agave. In traditional medicine, it is used as a treatment for headaches, the flu, and tuberculosis. These treatments involve infusing the roots in a drink or smoking the leaves. In addition, the stems can be used to make a garland to substitute for a sun hat on hot days, and the stems have been used as a fumigant to keep mosquitoes at bay. The Zuni people apply a poultice of moistened leaves to any body part for purification.

Rocky Mountain bee plant, since its seeds germinate well in disturbed soils and because of aforementioned benefits associated with pollinator attraction, is useful in Reclamation seed mixes.

References

Psoraleeae
Flora of the Southwestern United States
Plants used in traditional Native American medicine
Plants described in 1813
Taxa named by Frederick Traugott Pursh